Castlecove is a village in County Kerry, Ireland, located on the Iveragh peninsula on the N70 road which forms part of the Ring of Kerry.  It is situated on the southwestern side of the peninsula. "Cuan an Chaisleáin" in Irish means the same as "Castlecove", but an officially recognised Irish name for the town is "An Siopa Dubh". 

An Siopa Dubh, which translates to The Black Shop, is the name of a pub/shop in Castlecove.  Historic map from 1897-1913 labels the village as Blackshop.

References

See also
 List of towns and villages in Ireland

Towns and villages in County Kerry